Death Valley Unified School District (DVUSD) is a public school district in Inyo County, California. DVUSD is located in eastern Inyo County and borders the state of Nevada. The total population within this region is about 1,000, and DVUSD is the only school district to serve this population. Three communities served by DVUSD (Timbisha Indian Village, Furnace Creek Ranch and Stovepipe Wells) are located in Death Valley National Park. 

DVUSD is the largest school district in California in terms of square miles covered, but one of the smallest in terms of student enrollment. In 2012 the entire district served only 60 students. 

The district provides transportation to school for students in remote areas; this can involve a  bus ride each day. In 2012 the district was spending approximately $3,500 per student per year on transportation.

Schools 
Tecopa-Francis Elementary School
Shoshone Elementary School
Death Valley Academy
Shoshone Continuation High School

References

External links
 

School districts in Inyo County, California